The 2019 NCAA Division II Men's Soccer Championship was the 48th annual single-elimination tournament to determine the national champion of NCAA Division II men's collegiate soccer in the United States. The semifinals and championship game were played at Highmark Stadium in Pittsburgh, Pennsylvania from December 12–14, 2019 while the preceding rounds were played at various sites across the country during November 2019.

Qualification 
All Division II men's soccer programs were eligible to qualify for the 38-team tournament field. No teams received automatic bids; at-large bids are based on the teams' regular season records and the Quality of Winning Percentage Index. Teams were placed into one of four unbalanced super-regional brackets, consisting of eight or ten teams, based on geographic location.

Qualified Teams

Tournament bracket

Super-Region No. 1 
* Host Institution

Super-Region No. 2

Super-Region No. 3

Super-Region No. 4

Division II College Cup

Final

References 

NCAA Division II Men's Soccer Championship
NCAA Division II Men's Soccer Championship
NCAA Division II Men's Soccer Championship
NCAA Division II Men's Soccer Championship